Cornelia Rudloff-Schäffer (born 10 February 1957 in Bad Camberg/Taunus, West Germany) is the current president of the Deutsches Patent- und Markenamt (DPMA), a post she has held since 1 January 2009. She studied law, politics and media studies and was, after the second legal civil service examination, employed as academic employee at the Max Planck Institute for Foreign and International Patent, Copyright and Competition Law and at the Institut for the Protection of Industrial Property at the Ludwig Maximilian University of Munich. She will retire at the end of January 2023 and will be succeeded by Eva Schewior. Rudloff-Schäffer is the first woman to head the German Patent and Trade Mark Office "in the 145-year history of the office".

References

1957 births
German civil servants
Jurists from Hesse
Living people
People from Limburg-Weilburg